Howden, a suburb of Hobart, is a small, relatively isolated community on the shore of North West Bay in Tasmania Australia.

Location and features
As a result of the recent housing boom, Howden's population has increased, with the addition of new roads and development.

The waterfront is a five minute walk away from Howden. It is generally unsafe for swimming as it is shallow, polluted and full of sharp rocks. The beaches are largely empty and but contain fairy penguins at certain times of the year. Several different species of crabs live near the rocky shore. The Lapwing bird, seagulls, black and white cockatoos and ducks are all found in Howden. Many birds live in and around the Peter Murrell Conservation Area. The area is hilly with a suburban housing style.

See also

 List of Hobart suburbs

References

Southern Tasmania
Localities of Kingborough Council